Cloister Mountains is a mountain range in Alberta, Canada.

Cloister Mountains were so named on account of the shape of their outline.

References

Mountain ranges of Alberta